Nambucca Heads railway station is located on the North Coast line in New South Wales, Australia. It serves the town of Nambucca Heads, opening on 3 December 1923 as Nambucca Heads. It was renamed Nambucca in October 1925, before resuming its original name on 21 June 1964.

Platforms & services
Nambucca Heads has one platform. Each day northbound XPT services operate to Grafton and Casino, with three southbound services operating to Sydney including the Brisbane XPT. This station is a request stop for the southbound Casino XPT, so this service stops here only if passengers booked to board/alight here. The northbound Brisbane XPT passes through this station without stopping.

References

External links
Nambucca Heads station details Transport for New South Wales

Easy Access railway stations in New South Wales
Railway stations in Australia opened in 1923
Regional railway stations in New South Wales
North Coast railway line, New South Wales